The 1991 UCI Mountain Bike World Championships were held in Barga, Italy from 15 to 16 September 1991.

Medal summary

Men's events

Women's events

Medal table

References

External links

UCI Mountain Bike World Championships
International cycle races hosted by Italy
UCI Mountain Bike World Championships
Mountain biking events in Italy
Barga, Tuscany